Saints and Sinners is a 1949 British comedy drama film directed by Leslie Arliss and starring Kieron Moore, Christine Norden and Sheila Manahan.

Premise
The film follows life in small Irish town, where a man is wrongly accused of theft.

Cast
 Kieron Moore - Michael Kissane
 Christine Norden - Blanche
 Sheila Manahan - Sheila Flaherty
 Michael J. Dolan - Canon
 Maire O'Neill - Ma Murnaghan
 Tom Dillon - O'Brien
 Noel Purcell - Flaherty
 Pamela Arliss - Betty
 Edward Byrne - Barney Downey
 Sheila Ward- Clothing woman
 Eric Gorman - Madigan
 Eddie Byrne - Norreys
 Liam Redmond - O'Driscoll
 Tony Quinn - Berry
 Cecilia McKevitt - Maeve
 Sheila Richards- Eileen O' Hara
 Anita Bolster - Julia Ann Kermody

Production
It was filmed on location in and around Carlingford, Co. Louth, Ireland. There was some difficulty with Ireland's Actors' Equity over the hire of actors.

Reception
Variety said "appeal it limited for US market".

References

External links

 http://www.radiofones.com/saintsandsinners.htm

1949 films
1949 comedy-drama films
Films directed by Leslie Arliss
British comedy-drama films
British black-and-white films
1940s English-language films
1940s British films